Grysbok may refer to the following species of African antelope:

 Cape grysbok (Southern grysbok), found in the Cape region of South Africa
 Sharpe's grysbok (Northern grysbok), found in southeastern Africa